Josephine Addae-Mensah Afua (born 1947) is a Ghanaian politician and a member of the first Parliament of the fourth Republic representing the
Bosomtwe constituency in the Ashanti region. She represents the Every Ghanaian Living Everywhere political party.

Early life and education
Afua Mensah was born in 1947 at Apinkra in the Ashanti Region of Ghana. She attended the Akorokerri Teacher Training College and obtained her Teacher's Training Certificate.

Politics
Afua Mensah was first elected into Parliament on the ticket of the Every Ghanaian Living Everywhere Political Party during the 1992 Ghanaian parliamentary election for the Bosomtwe Constituency. she served for one term as a parliamentarian for the Bosomtwe constituency. She was succeeded by Adu Gyamfi Poku of the New Patriotic Party during the 1996 Ghanaian general elections.

Career
Afua Mensah is a teacher by profession and a former member of parliament for the Bosomtwe Constituency in the Ashanti Region of Ghana.

Personal life
Afua Mensah is a Christian.

References

Living people
1947 births
People from Ashanti Region
Ghanaian MPs 1993–1997
Ghanaian Christians
Ghanaian educators
21st-century Ghanaian politicians